The hymenostomes are an order of ciliate protozoa.  Most are free-living in freshwater, such as the commonly studied genus Tetrahymena, but some are parasitic on fish or aquatic invertebrates.  Among these is the important species Ichthyophthirius multifiliis, a common cause of death in aquaria and fish farms.

The hymenostomes are fairly typical members of the Oligohymenophorea.  Their body cilia are mostly uniform, sometimes with a few long caudal cilia, and arise from monokinetids or from dikinetids at the anterior.  The oral cilia are in general distinctly tetrahymenal, with three membranelles and a paroral membrane, which corresponds only to the middle segment of the tripartite membranes found in certain scuticociliates.  Mouth formation during cell division usually begins next to a postoral kinety.

The hymenostomes were first defined by Delage & Hérouard in 1896.  Initially the scuticociliates and peniculids were included, then later treated as separate orders of a subclass Hymenostomatia, to which the astomes are sometimes added.  More recently each of these groups tends to be treated as a separate subclass.

References 

Oligohymenophorea